Garczynski Nunatak is a cone-shaped nunatak, the highest in a cluster of nunataks close west of Mount Brecher, lying at the north flank of Quonset Glacier in the Wisconsin Range of the Horlick Mountains of Antarctica. It was mapped by the United States Geological Survey from surveys and U.S. Navy air photos, 1959–60, and was named by the Advisory Committee on Antarctic Names for Carl J. Garczynski, a meteorologist in the Byrd Station winter party, 1961.

References

Nunataks of Marie Byrd Land